
Year 788 (DCCLXXXVIII) was a leap year starting on Tuesday  of the Julian calendar. The denomination 788 for this year has been used since the early medieval period, when the Anno Domini calendar era became the prevalent method in Europe for naming years.

Events 
 By place 

 Byzantine Empire 
 September – Battle of Kopidnadon: An Abbasid expeditionary force crosses the Cilician Gates into the Anatolic Theme (modern Turkey). It is confronted by two Byzantine armies at Podandos in Cappadocia, who are defeated. 
 Byzantine troops led by Adalgis, son of former Lombard king Desiderius, invade southern Italy. His attempts are thwarted by the Franks, who attack territories in Benevento, obtaining notably the annexion of Chieti (Spoleto).

 Europe 
 King Charlemagne conquers Bavaria, and incorporates it into the Frankish Kingdom. Duke Tassilo III is deposed, and banished to a monastery.
 Grimoald III, Lombard duke of Benevento, is installed as semi-client by King Charles the Younger (son of Charlemagne) at Benevento (Italy).
 The Avars, who are allied with Tassilo III, invade East Francia (modern Germany). This begins the Frankish-Avar conflict.
 King Mauregatus of Asturias dies after a 5-year reign, and is succeeded by Bermudo I as ruler of Asturias (modern Spain).
 Abd al-Rahman I, emir of Córdoba, dies after a 32-year reign and is succeeded by his son Hisham I.
 The earliest recorded tornado in Europe struck Freising in 788."Tornadoliste Deutschland". https://tornadoliste.de/788. German meteorological list of documented tornadoes

 Britain 
 King Ælfwald I of Northumbria is murdered, probably at Chesters, by the patricius (ealdorman) Sicga. He is succeeded by his cousin Osred II.

 Abbasid Caliphate 

 September – Battle of Kopidnadon: An Abbasid expeditionary force against the Byzantine Empire crosses the Cilician Gates into the Anatolic Theme. The Abbasid army launched an invasion of Byzantine Asia Minor, and was confronted by a Byzantine force at Kopidnadon. The resulting battle was an Abbasid victory.
 Idris ibn Abdallah, known as the "founder of Morocco", settles in Volubilis, beginning the reign of the Idrisid Dynasty (Morocco had effectively been independent from the Arab caliphates since the Great Berber Revolt).

 By topic 
 Religion 
 The period covered in Adam of Bremen's historical treatise of the Archbishopric of Hamburg begins.
 The Enryaku-ji temple complex is founded by Saichō, a Buddhist monk, on Mount Hiei in Ōtsu (Japan).

Births 
 Abu Tammam, Muslim poet (d. 845)
 Adi Shankara, Indian philosopher and theologian (d. 832)
 Aejang, king of Silla (Korea) (d. 809)
 Al-Zubayr ibn Bakkar, Muslim historian (d. 870)
 Ida of Herzfeld, Frankish duchess and saint (approximate date)
 Li Zaiyi, general of the Tang Dynasty (d. 837)
 Methodios I, patriarch of Constantinople (or 800)

Deaths 
 September 23 – Ælfwald I, king of Northumbria
 Abd al-Rahman I, Muslim emir of Córdoba (b. 731)
 Adalgis, king and co-regent of the Lombards
 Hnabi, duke of the Alemanni (approximate date)
 Mauregatus, king of Asturias (or 789)
 Mazu Daoyi, Chinese Zen Buddhist monk (b. 709)
 Ōnakatomi no Kiyomaro, Japanese nobleman (b. 702)

References

Sources